Veikko Täär (born 7 September 1971 in Tartu) is an Estonian actor, sport psychologist, athlete, educator and entrepreneur.

Täär graduated from Tartu 10th Secondary School in 1989. From 1989 until 1991, he studied physics at the University of Tartu, before enrolling at the Estonian Academy of Music and Theatre to study acting, graduating cum laude in 1998. After graduation, he performed in  productions at the Estonian Drama Theatre, Vanemuine, Ugala and several other theatres and is a freelance actor. Besides theatre roles he has played also in several films and television series and hosted several television sports programmes.

Täär is a successful amateur athlete (ski marathons, triathlons, etc.) and was the owner of the Otepää café l.u.m.i.

Awards
 1996: Voldemar Panso Prize

Filmography

 1993: Õnne 13 (television series, role: Raivo Tiik)
 1998: Pall vastu seina (feature film, role: Einar)
 2004: Täna öösel me ei maga (feature film, role: Leo)
 2006: Kuldrannake (feature film, role: Allan)
 2011: Kormoranid ehk nahkpükse ei pesta (feature film, role: Photographer)
 2015: Keeris	(television series, role: Kain Teebel)
 2016―2018: Siberi võmm (television series, role: Viktor Korol)
 2016: Õnn tuleb magades (feature film, role: Kaupo)
 2017: Lotte lood	(television series, role: Mati, Bruno's father)
 2019: ENSV (television series, role: Kestutis)
 2019: Mehed (feature film, role: Veikko)
 2021: Vaga vesi (television series, role: Riho)

References

Living people
1971 births
Estonian male stage actors
Estonian male television actors
Estonian male film actors
20th-century Estonian male actors
21st-century Estonian male actors
Estonian television personalities
Estonian businesspeople
Estonian Academy of Music and Theatre alumni
Male actors from Tartu
Sportspeople from Tartu
People from Tartu